Distant Constellation is a 2017 documentary film directed by Shevaun Mizrahi. It was nominated for a 2018 Independent Spirit Award and included in Film Comments Best Undistributed Films of 2017. The film was produced by Deniz Buga and Shelly Grizim.

 Awards 
It received many awards both in the US and internationally, including the International Documentary Association Best Cinematography Award.  It is also nominated for two Cinema Eye Honor Awards. The details on the awards are below:

 Viennale (Vienna International Film Festival) - FIPRESCI PRIZE 

 Won: International Critics Prize Distant Constellation, 2017

 Seville Film Festival 2017 

 Won: New Waves Non-fiction Award Distant Constellation, 2017

 The 23rd annual Independent Spirit Awards Nomination 

 Nominated: The 23rd annual Independent Spirit Awards Nomination

 Best Picture Prize at Jeonju International Film Festival 

 Won: Best Picture Prize at Jeonju International Film Festival 2018'''

 Locarno Festival 2017 

 Won: Jury's Special Mention Award, 2017

Some other awards that the documentary won are:
 International Documentary Association Awards, Best Cinematography Award 
 International Documentary Association Awards, Best Editing Nominee 
 Cinema Eye Honors, Best Debut Film Nominee
 Cinema Eye Honors, Best Cinematography Nominee 
London Film Festival, Best Documentary Nominee
 Tacoma Film Festival, Best Documentary Award 
DokuFest, Best Film Award
Message to Man, Best Debut Award
 Message to Man, International Federation of Film Societies Prize
 Yerevan Golden Apricot Film Festival, Best Documentary Award

 Press Coverage 
 Indiewire wrote, 
— "Distant Constellation is one of the more exciting achievements in nonfiction cinema in recent memory... Soulful, humorous, visually delicate."Hollywood Reporter called it,
— "A quiet gem."Slant Magazine wrote,
— "A master class in the art of the portrait."Financial Times called it,
— "A dazzling study of age and memory."
 It was Sight & Sound Film of the month. It appeared in the Sight & Sound'' September 2018 edition. They wrote:
— "Funny, startling and touching... Dreamlike... an unusually warm, complex and illuminating picture."

References

External links
 

Turkish documentary films
2017 films
2017 documentary films